Dallwatsonia is a genus of Australian, Asian, and Neotropical plants in the grass family. Most of the species have been incorporated into the genus only recently, transferred from Panicum in 2014.

The genus is named for Australian botanists Michael Dallwitz and Leslie Watson.

 Species
 Dallwatsonia aurita (J. Presl ex Nees) J.R. Grande - India, China, southeast Asia, New Guinea
 Dallwatsonia bresolinii (L.B. Sm. & Wassh.) J.R. Grande - Santa Catarina
 Dallwatsonia condensata (Bertol.) J.R. Grande - Bahia, Minas Gerais, Rio de Janeiro, São Paulo
 Dallwatsonia felliana B.K. Simon - Queensland in Australia
 Dallwatsonia hylaeica (Mez) J.R. Grande - widespread in Mesoamerica, South America, West Indies
 Dallwatsonia leptachne (Döll) J.R. Grande - Minas Gerais, Paraná, Rio de Janeiro, São Paulo
 Dallwatsonia longa (Hitchc. & Chase) J.R. Grande - Veracruz in Mexico
 Dallwatsonia pilosa (Sw.) J.R. Grande - widespread in Mesoamerica, South America, West Indies
 Dallwatsonia polygonata (Schrad.) J.R. Grande - widespread in Mesoamerica, South America, West Indies
 Dallwatsonia stagnatilis (Hitchc. & Chase) J.R. Grande	- Mesoamerica
 Dallwatsonia stevensiana (Hitchc. & Chase) J.R. Grande - West Indies, northern South America

References

Poaceae genera
Panicoideae